Marco Augusto Romizi (born February 13, 1990) is an Italian footballer who plays as a midfielder for Cavese.

Club career

Fiorentina 
He is a product of Fiorentina youth teams. In July 2009, he was sold to Reggiana of Lega Pro Prima Divisione in co-ownership.

In June 2010, he was bought back by la viola.

Bari 
On 13 January 2012 he was transferred to Bari on co-ownership terms.

Serie C
On 28 January 2020, he signed with Serie C club Picerno.

On 29 December 2020 he joined Bisceglie.

Serie D
On 15 September 2021, he moved to Cavese in Serie D.

International career
He represented Italy at the 2009 FIFA U-20 World Cup. On 17 November 2010 he made his debut with the Italy U-21 team in friendly match against Turkey.

References

External links
 

1990 births
Sportspeople from Arezzo
Living people
Italian footballers
Italy youth international footballers
Italy under-21 international footballers
Association football midfielders
A.C. Reggiana 1919 players
ACF Fiorentina players
S.S.C. Bari players
L.R. Vicenza players
U.C. AlbinoLeffe players
AZ Picerno players
A.S. Bisceglie Calcio 1913 players
Cavese 1919 players
Serie B players
Serie C players
Serie D players
Footballers from Tuscany